Stilobezzia antennalis is a species of predaceous midge in the family Ceratopogonidae.

References

Further reading

 
 

Ceratopogonidae
Articles created by Qbugbot
Insects described in 1901